A. smithii may refer to:

 Asteriscus smithii, species of flower
 Astraeus smithii, species of fungus